Lieutenant Colonel John Masters, DSO, OBE (26 October 1914 – 7 May 1983) was a British novelist and regular officer of the Indian Army.

In World War II, he served with the Chindits behind enemy lines in Burma, and became the GSO1 (chief staff officer) of the 19th Indian Infantry Division. Masters is principally known for his historical novels set in India, notably Bhowani Junction, which was turned into a successful film. He also wrote three volumes of autobiography, which were positively received by critics.

Life
Masters was the son of a regular soldier, a lieutenant-colonel whose family had a long tradition of service in the British Indian Army. He was educated at Wellington and the Royal Military College, Sandhurst. On graduating from Sandhurst in 1933, he was seconded to the Duke of Cornwall's Light Infantry (DCLI) for a year before applying to serve with the 4th Prince of Wales's Own Gurkha Rifles. He saw service on the North-West Frontier with the 2nd battalion of the regiment, and was rapidly given a variety of appointments within the battalion and the regimental depot.

In 1938, he organised a hunt for a leopard reported to be roaming the depot at Bakloh, only to find himself facing a full-grown tiger (which killed one of the Gurkhas acting as beaters). He later commented that whatever rank and decorations he was awarded, he was always known to the Gurkhas as "The Sahib who shot the Bakloh tiger".

In early 1939, he was appointed the Adjutant of the 2nd battalion of the 4th Gurkhas. During the Second World War his battalion was sent to Basra in Iraq, during the brief Anglo-Iraqi War. Masters subsequently served in Iraq, Syria, and Persia with the battalion, before being briefly seconded as a staff officer in a Line of Communications HQ. In early 1942, he attended the Indian Army's Staff College at Quetta. Here he met the wife of a fellow officer and they began an affair.  Even though they later married, there was something of a scandal at the time.

After passing the Staff College, Masters next served as brigade major in the 114th Indian Infantry Brigade before being "poached" by Joe Lentaigne, another officer from the 4th Gurkhas, to be brigade major in 111th Indian Infantry Brigade, a Chindit formation. From March 1944, the brigade served behind the Japanese lines in Burma. On the death of General Orde Wingate on 24 April, Lentaigne became the Chindits' overall commander and Masters commanded the main body of 111 Brigade.

In May, the brigade was ordered to hold a position code-named 'Blackpool' near Mogaung in northern Burma. The isolated position was attacked with great intensity for seventeen days and eventually the brigade was forced to withdraw. Masters felt obliged to order the medical orderlies to shoot 19 of his own men, casualties who had no hope of recovery or rescue. Masters later wrote about these events in the second volume of his autobiography, The Road Past Mandalay. In recognition of his "gallant and distinguished services in Burma", he was in October awarded the DSO.

After briefly commanding the 3rd battalion of his regiment, Masters subsequently became GSO1 (the Chief of Staff) of Indian 19th Infantry Division, which was heavily involved in the later stages of the Burma Campaign, until the end of the war. On 17 January 1946 he was awarded an OBE for his service in Burma. After a spell as a staff officer in GHQ India in Delhi, he then served as an instructor at the British Army Staff College, Camberley. He left the army after this posting, and moved to the United States, where he attempted to set up a business promoting walking tours in the Himalayas, one of his hobbies. The business was not a success and, to make ends meet, he decided to write of his experiences in the army. When his novels proved popular, he became a full-time writer.

In later life, Masters and his wife Barbara moved to Santa Fe, New Mexico. He died in 1983 from complications following heart surgery. His family and friends scattered his ashes from an aeroplane over a mountain trail he frequently hiked in. General Sir Michael Rose, the former UN commander in Bosnia, is a stepson of Masters.

Personality
John Masters: A Regimented Life by John Clay was published by Michael Joseph in 1992. Now out of print, it is a sympathetic but not uncritical biography. According to Clay, Masters possessed a strong and sometimes domineering personality, and could be impatient with weakness or incompetence. He could also be extremely warmhearted and generous. His outgoing and boisterous personality flourished during his long residence in the United States. Masters was impatient with the literary establishment, which faulted his Indian novels as unsympathetic to Indians, and he was impatient with editors who wanted to remove the rough edges from his characters. Masters strove for accuracy and realism, resenting it when people mistook his characters' views as his own. He was extremely hard-working and meticulously well-organised, both as a soldier and a novelist. Clay speculates that Masters may have been driven to achieve by rumours that his family was not "pure" English, but Anglo-Indian or Eurasian. In 1962 Masters learned what he had apparently long suspected, that he did indeed have a distant Indian ancestor.

Clay's biography provides details that Masters omitted from the three volumes of autobiography he wrote: Bugles and a Tiger (1956); Road Past Mandalay (1961); and Pilgrim Son (1971). They are nevertheless extremely revealing.  Bugles and a Tiger, details Masters's time at Sandhurst and service on India's northwest frontier on the eve of the Second World War.  Road Past Mandalay deals mostly with the Burma campaign in the War, while Pilgrim Son chronicles his career as a writer.

Literary works

History of the British in India
Apart from the autobiographical works mentioned above, Masters is also known for his historical novels set in India. Seven of these portray members of successive generations of the Savage family serving in the British and Indian Armies in India, in an attempt to trace the history of the British in India through the life of one family. In chronological order of events (but not in order of publication) these novels are:
 Coromandel! (1955): a 17th-century English youth runs away to sea and ends up in India.
 The Deceivers (1952): an English officer goes undercover to root out the ritual murders of Thuggee.
 Nightrunners of Bengal (1951): a tale of the Indian Rebellion of 1857.
 The Lotus and the Wind (1953): a tale of The Great Game of British and Russian agents on the Northwest Frontier.
 Far, Far the Mountain Peak (1957): a tale of mountaineering and the First World War.
 Bhowani Junction (1954): a romance set in a railway town at the time of Indian calls for independence and the Partition of India.
 To the Coral Strand (1962): the story of an ex-officer who refuses to go gracefully after Indian independence.
 The Ravi Lancers (1972): an offshoot of the series, set in the First World War, with one of the protagonists related to the Savages but having a different name.
 The Himalayan Concerto (1972): another offshoot, as the protagonist isn't named Savage, a 1970s Cold War thriller about spying on a planned Chinese invasion of India.

One of Masters's last Indian novels, The Venus of Konpara, is notable for the fact that its principal characters are Indians. The Savage family play no role in the storyline, though it is hinted that a minor unidentified character is a family member. It is set in the nineteenth century during the British Raj, but explores the history of Indo-Aryan and Dravidian identities in the country.

Master's works have come under criticism for their depiction of Indian characters. However, both Nightrunners of Bengal and The Ravi Lancers contain sympathetic portrayals of Indian nationalists and portray irreconcilable tensions between British and Indian characters that mirror the conflicts inherent in British India in a manner comparable to E. M. Forster's A Passage to India. The descendant of the hero of the former novel (who is in practice manifestly the same character) experiences the partition of India with a resigned detachment and later undergoes a deep personal crisis which ends with his staying on in independent India rather than returning to Britain. One Indian novelist (Khushwant Singh) remarked that while Kipling understood India, Masters understood Indians.

Adaptations
The best-known film is probably Bhowani Junction (1956), which concerns the Partition of India and the Anglo-Indian community. It starred Ava Gardner. Four of the novels (the 2nd, 3rd, 4th & 6th in the series) were adapted for an 18-part serial in BBC Radio 4's Classic Serial slot, being broadcast from October 1984 to January 1985. The Venus of Konpara had also been dramatised for BBC Radio in 1973. The Deceivers was filmed in 1988 and starred Pierce Brosnan.

Other themes

Masters's trilogy of Now God Be Thanked, Heart of War, and In The Green of the Spring has some claim to be considered his magnum opus, covering the changes to various segments of British society wrought by the upheavals of the First World War. Masters's book Man of War appears to have been the first of a planned trilogy on the Second World War; however, the author died before any other connected books were published.

The 1959 Fandango Rock, written in between the Indian books, is an exception - its plot being set in the fascist Spain ruled by General Franco and focusing on the relationship between the American and Spanish governments.

In the 1950s and 1960s the books of Masters sold in large numbers, particularly Bhowani Junction, which was also translated into various other languages. Some of his works are now out of print.

Publications

Fiction

Non-fiction

References

External links
 

1914 births
1983 deaths
Anglo-Indian people
Indian Army personnel of World War II
Royal Gurkha Rifles officers
People educated at Wellington College, Berkshire
Companions of the Distinguished Service Order
Graduates of the Royal Military College, Sandhurst
Duke of Cornwall's Light Infantry officers
20th-century British novelists
Writers in British India
Graduates of the Staff College, Quetta
British Indian Army officers
Academics of the Staff College, Camberley
Military personnel of British India
British emigrants to the United States
People from Santa Fe, New Mexico
Writers from Kolkata